Laurens Vermijl (born 3 February 1997) is a Belgian footballer who plays for Thes Sport in the Belgian National Division 1 as a winger.

Vermijl made his professional debut for Genk in May 2017, in a 1–1 draw with Lokeren, as part of the 2016–17 Belgian First Division A.

He is the brother of Marnick Vermijl, who is also a professional footballer.

References

External links
 

1997 births
Living people
Association football midfielders
Belgian footballers
K.R.C. Genk players
Lommel S.K. players
Belgian Pro League players
Challenger Pro League players
Belgian Third Division players
K.V.V. Thes Sport Tessenderlo players